Tu-Endie-Wei State Park is located at the confluence of the Kanawha River and the Ohio River in downtown Point Pleasant, West Virginia.  The park commemorates the Battle of Point Pleasant, fought between the settler militia of Virginia and the forces of Shawnee Chief Cornstalk on October 10, 1774.  The militia victory by the settlers weakened the alliance between native forces and the British and freed up settlers from western Virginia to cross the Allegheny Mountains and join in the American Revolutionary War.

The name "Tu-Endie-Wei" refers to the Wyandot Indian phrase meaning "the point between two waters" in English.

The Battle of Point Pleasant has been recognized as the first battle of the American Revolutionary War by the National Society of Daughters of the American Revolution. Female descendants of battle veterans are allowed to join the D.A.R. The historical debate about the first battle claim may not yet be resolved.

The 1796 Mansion House is historic house museum originally used as a tavern.  The Colonel Charles Lewis Chapter, N.S. Daughters of the American Revolution operates the Mansion House Museum on a seasonal basis.

See also

List of West Virginia state parks

References

External links
 
 Tu-Endie-Wei State Park - Town of Point Pleasant information
 Chief Cornstalk burial marker

History of West Virginia
State parks of West Virginia
Protected areas of Mason County, West Virginia
Historic house museums in West Virginia
Museums in Mason County, West Virginia
Military and war museums in West Virginia
Point Pleasant, West Virginia
1901 establishments in West Virginia
IUCN Category III